Fissurella bridgesii is a species of sea snail, a marine gastropod mollusk in the family Fissurellidae, the keyhole limpets and slit limpets.

Description
The size of the shell varies between 50 mm and 100 mm.

Distribution
This species occurs in the Pacific Ocean from Peru to Central Chile.

References

External links
 To Biodiversity Heritage Library (5 publications)
 To World Register of Marine Species
 

Fissurellidae
Gastropods described in 1849